Érd is a town in Pest County, Budapest metropolitan area, Hungary. It is a city with county rights.

History

The area has been inhabited since ancient times. Archaeological findings indicate that prehistoric humans lived here 50,000 years ago.

Érd itself was first mentioned in documents in 1243.

During the Ottoman occupation of Hungary, Érd was captured by the Turks in 1543, after the castle of Székesfehérvár fell. The Turks built a motte castle and a mosque here. During this time, the area was called Hamzsabég (Hamzabey). In 1684, the army led by Charles V, Duke of Lorraine defeated the Turks near Érd.

In 1776, Érd became an oppidum (town). It is possible that it already had been an oppidum before the Ottoman occupation. In the early 20th century, Érd became the property of the Károlyi family. The town grew, but remained mainly an agricultural town until 1972, when several new facilities were built and the tourist value of Érd grew.

Érd was the fastest-growing locality in Hungary between the 1991 and 2001 censuses (up 30.6%). On November 7, 2005, the Parliament decided that Érd would be granted the rank of city with county rights from the date of the next council election in autumn 2006.

Coat of arms

The coat of arms of Érd (designed by the local sculptor Emil Eőry and librarian Lajos Horváth in mid-1991) is a shield, rectangular with a conical base and a cut in the optical bisector. In the upper field of gold is a green tree with a black outline and an open, three-branched lily crown set in a five-armed canopy, the lilies of which have three petals each, making a total of nine.

The tree and the crown refer to the name of the Árpád-period forest of Érd and the royal forest ranger. The three branches of the crown are reminiscent of the Ákos-házy Sárkány, Illésházy and Batthyány families, who were vital in the history of Érd. The nine petals of the three lily branches represent the nine districts of the present-day city.

The lower blue field shows a red dragon curved into a wheel, with a Latin gold cross in its looping tail. It refers to the fact that the members of the Sárkány family were the soldiers of an Order founded by King Sigismund. The gold field symbolises value, ideals and harmony, while the blue represents the Danube.

Transport 

Mass transit is operated by Volánbusz, with five bus lines. Many buses depart to nearby cities, such as Sóskút, Pusztazámor, Százhalombatta, and Budapest.

In the city, there are five railway stations (Érd, Érd alsó, Érd felső, Tétényliget, and Érdliget). Passengers can travel to Budapest, Pécs, Nagykanizsa, etc.

Tourist sights
 Hungarian Geographical Museum, founded by geographer Dénes Balázs
 Saint Michael Church
 Turkish Érd minaret (17th century; one of only three existing minarets of the country)
 Remains of an ancient Roman road
 Fundoklia Valley with rare plant species

Demographics

Population by nationalities:
Magyars – 93.4%
Romani – 1%
Germans – 0.6%
Others – 0.8%
No answer, unknown – 4.2%

Population by denominations:
Roman Catholic – 49.2%
Calvinist – 14.2%
Greek Catholic – 2.2%
Lutheran – 1.8%
Others (Christian) – 1.5%
Others (non-Christian) – 0.2%
Atheist – 16.5%
No answer, unknown – 14.3%

Politics 
The current mayor of Érd is László Csőzik (Independent).

The local Municipal Assembly, elected at the 2019 local government elections, is made up of 18 members (one mayor, 12 individual constituencies MEPs and five Compensation List MEPs) divided into this political parties and alliances:

List of mayors
List of city mayors from 1990:

Notable people
Ádám Szabó (born 1992), singer
Ferenc Miákits (1876–1924), politician, minister of finance of the Hungarian Soviet Republic
Ferenc Molnár (1891–?), footballer
Rudolf Pap (born 1989), animator
Zita Szeleczky (1915–1999), actress

Twin towns – sister cities

Érd is twinned with:
 Kolín, Czech Republic
 Levice, Slovakia
 Lubaczów, Poland
 Poynton, England, United Kingdom
 Reghin, Romania
 Xuzhou, China

References

Notes

External links 

  in Hungarian
 Aerial photography: Érd

Populated places in Pest County
Budapest metropolitan area
Cities with county rights of Hungary